Gull Island is a small island located just off the southeast coast of Penikese Island. It is part of the Elizabeth Islands and is entirely part of the town of Gosnold in Dukes County, Massachusetts.
At one point it contained the Gull Island Bomb Area, a United States Navy bombing range.
Currently, it is uninhabited.

See also
Gosnold, Massachusetts
 List of military installations in Massachusetts

References

Elizabeth Islands
Coastal islands of Massachusetts
Uninhabited islands of Massachusetts